Dresden is an agricultural community in southwestern Ontario, Canada, part of the municipality of Chatham-Kent. It is located on the Sydenham River. The community is named after Dresden, Germany. The major crops in the area are wheat, soybeans, rubber trees, corn and tomatoes. Its post office was established in 1852.

Dresden is best known as the home of Josiah Henson, an African-Canadian leader and minister whose life story was an inspiration for the novel Uncle Tom's Cabin. The Henson homestead is a historic site located near Dresden, owned and operated by the Ontario Heritage Trust.

A meteorite fall occurred near Dresden in 1939.

History

Culture

As an important terminus of the Underground Railroad via overland and marine routes the town was part of a settlement formerly known as the Dawn Settlement.  It is the site of Uncle Tom's Cabin Historic Site, which lies just outside its borders at the corner of Park St. and Uncle Tom's Road (the former 3rd concession). The town and its organizations (including the Horticultural Society, Rotary and IODE), have striven to develop the town's historical legacy and its natural features, particularly the Sydenham River. Dresden's floodplain area, since a 100-year flood in 1968, has been constantly improved with the addition of landscaped parklands, an arboretum featuring the area's original and diverse Carolinian flora, and the Trillium Trail which includes a historical walk portion.  The gateway to the Trillium Trail with its eight interpretive signs can be accessed at St. George Street in the center of the town, near the bridge. The trail itself features 20 plaques which point out historical sites along a bricked path.  The trail celebrates history which is both typical to small rural towns of the period and unique to Dresden's ties to the Underground Railroad story.

Dresden was once home to not only Rev. Josiah Henson famous because of his association with the title character of Harriett Beecher Stowe's Uncle Tom's Cabin, but a variety of prominent figures from the Underground Railroad period. A recent discovery through the Trillium Trail Project which has been verified by research done in partnership with the Promised Land Project, headed by Boulou de B'beri of the University of Ottawa, is that large sections of the original town site were owned between 1853 and 1873 by William Whipper, a prominent member of the William Still Underground Railroad network. Today a number of artifact houses from this time period are still extant in the community.  The local Catherine McVean Chapter of the IODE offers historical tours to visitors who wish to know more of the town's history. The town is also home to civil rights actions both in the 1850s and 1950s, and this and other historical events are commemorated on various Ontario Heritage historical plaques in the town.

The Sydenham River which flows through the town, is known for its rare fauna, and the Trillium Trail, particularly in the downtown's arboretum area features signage that educates on rare plants and animals that live here.

The town features a number of special events each year, including a Show and Shine for classic autos, and weekly concerts on Thursday evenings during the summer months at Rotary Park.

Dresden is also the location of the Dresden Raceway, the only harness racing facility in the municipality of Chatham-Kent. It features a 1/2-mile track and modern grandstand facility. The track also serves as a training facility for young pacers and trotters.  Dresden was also home to the Dresden Slots operated by Gateway Casinos & Entertainment Limited since moved to Chatham as Cascades Casino.

The downtown area runs for about 3 blocks, with stores and businesses that serve the local and surrounding community and tourists. For a bit of colour, the streets are lined with planters courtesy of the Dresden Horticultural Society and many volunteers. In October, just before Halloween, there are cornstalk and scarecrow decorations on the lampposts. There is a grocery store, a drug store, jewellery and gifts, photography studio, a Sears outlet, post office, automotive supplies, dentist, doctors, optometrist, a gym, legal advice, and more. A medical facility, operated by the Chatham-Kent Family Health Team, opened in 2012.

In 1871, 72% of Dresden's 700 residents were Black Canadians. This number has steadily declined over the years. By 1949, Dresden was 17% Black. The proportion of Black residents dropped to 11% in 2001, and reached a historic low of 5.5% in 2016.

The North Star: Finding Black Mecca, a 2021 film about Chatham-Kent's black communities and history is partly filmed in Dresden.

Human rights history

Hugh Burnett returned to his home town of Dresden, after serving his country in World War II. However, he was not served in some restaurants because he was black. So, in 1948, he and other African Canadians founded the National Unity Association. They collected 115 names on a petition to end discrimination. This resulted in a referendum in Dresden which asked "Do you approve of the council passing a bylaw licensing restaurants in Dresden and restraining the owner or owners from refusing service regardless of race, colour or creed?" 108 voted that restaurant owners should serve everyone. 517 voted against. The vote in favour, was roughly equal to the proportion of African Canadians in the town - indicating nearly all European (white) residents voted against ending discrimination in Dresden.

In 1954 Burnett was part of a delegation to Ontario Premier Leslie Frost and the cabinet. Soon after that the Ontario Fair Accommodation Practices Act passed. It stated that "no one can deny to any person or class of persons the accommodation, services or facilities  usually available to members of the public."

However some restaurants and barber shops still refused to serve African Canadians. Justice William F. Schwenger investigated the complaints as a one-man commission. On the basis of  his recommendations, Charles Daley, the minister of labour, refused to prosecute the two Dresden restaurant owners who had refused to serve black people. Daley said "I understand these people will in future obey the law".

On October 29, 1954,  Hugh Burnett, Bromley Armstrong and Ruth Lor Malloy went to Morley McKay's restaurant with a reporter. They were denied service.  Mr. McKay was the first person to be charged under the Act. After a long legal battle, Mr. McKay opened his restaurant to everyone.

The conflicting attitudes of white and black Dresden residents over the issue was recorded in the National Film Board's documentary the Dresden Story in 1954.

On July 31, 2010, a plaque was installed in Dresden that honoured Hugh Burnett and the National Unity Association. It reads:

Climate and geography

The climate is mild, being classified as humid continental (Köppen climate classification Dfb) that closely borders on the Dfa climate type. In an average summer, temperatures exceed or reach  on 16 days per year. Occasionally, mild spells of weather can make the temperature exceed  for 1 or 2 days while arctic air masses from the north can bring temperatures below  for 1–3 days during winter. Dresden is not located in the snowbelt region which begins near London, Ontario, causing winter precipitation to be generally low and snow cover to be intermittent throughout the season. The average annual snowfall is only .

Education

Dresden has one secondary school, Lambton-Kent Composite School (LKCS) and one elementary school, Dresden Area Central School (DACS), that serve Dresden and the surrounding communities.

Industry and small business

Dresden features a number of small businesses from gas stations to small specialty stores.
Dresden is home to ConAgra Foods canning plant; where they produce many canned vegetables as well as Aylmer Ketchup.  
Martinrea Fabco auto parts manufacturer, Richcote Metal Coating, Waste Wood Disposal, MPT Automation Technologies, as well as many other retail stores.

In 2007, Dresden celebrated the 125th year since its founding.

References

External links
Dresden Website

Black Canadian settlements
Communities in Chatham-Kent
Populated places on the Underground Railroad